The Long Beach Peninsula is an arm of land on the southern coast of the state of Washington in the United States. Entirely within Pacific County, it is bounded on the west by the Pacific Ocean, the south by the Columbia River, and the east by Willapa Bay. Leadbetter Point State Park and Willapa National Wildlife Refuge are at the northern end of the peninsula and Cape Disappointment is at the southern end, with Pacific Pines State Park located in between.

Cape Disappointment State Park west of Ilwaco, part of the Lewis and Clark National Historical Park, was the westernmost terminus for the Lewis and Clark Expedition. A monument designed by Maya Lin as part of the Confluence Project was dedicated there in 2005.

The Long Beach Peninsula is known for its continuous sand beach  in extent on the Pacific Ocean side, claimed to be the longest beach in the United States. It is a popular vacation destination for people from Seattle, Washington ( distant) and Portland, Oregon ( distant).

Geography
Due to its low elevation and coastal location, the peninsula is at high risk of severe damage in the event of a tsunami.

Economy
The principal industry of the Long Beach Peninsula has become tourism, though fishing, crabbing, oyster farming, and cranberry farming are also important components of the local economy. The Long Beach Peninsula is located on the west side of the Willapa Bay, considered the number one producer of farmed oysters in the United States and among the top five producers worldwide.

The Long Beach Peninsula has become one of the most popular tourism destinations in the State of Washington, and has attracted visitors from all over North America. As one of the final destinations of the Lewis and Clark Expedition, several television specials have brought publicity to this area. A multitude of events and festivals are held throughout the year including the Washington State International Kite Festival, the Sandsations sandcastle sculpting competition, and the annual The Rod Run to the End of the World, which attracts thousands of visitors on the weekend following Labor Day.

Cities and towns
Ilwaco
Long Beach
Nahcotta
Ocean Park
Oysterville
Seaview

Notes

External links 

Long Beach Peninsula Tourist/Visitor Info Website

Beaches of Washington (state)
Landforms of Pacific County, Washington
Peninsulas of Washington (state)